Craig H. Dill (born December 17, 1944) was an American basketball player.

Dill played college basketball at the University of Michigan.  He was a 6'11" center.

Dill was drafted in the fourth round (11th pick, 42nd overall) of the 1967 NBA Draft by the San Diego Rockets but opted instead to play for the Pittsburgh Pipers of the American Basketball Association.

Dill was a member of the 1967–68 Pittsburgh Pipers team that won the 1968 ABA Championship.  During that season Dill averaged 6.8 points and 5.8 rebounds per game.

References

External links
Basketball-Reference.com Craig Dill page

1944 births
Living people
American men's basketball players
Basketball players from Michigan
Michigan Wolverines men's basketball players
Pittsburgh Pipers players
Place of birth missing (living people)
San Diego Rockets draft picks
Sportspeople from Saginaw, Michigan
Centers (basketball)